is a passenger railway station located in the city of Mitaka, Tokyo, Japan, operated by the private railway operator Keio Corporation.

Lines

Service pattern
Only all-stations "Local" services stop at this station. During the daytime, there are eight services per hour in either direction.

Station layout

The station has two opposing ground-level side platforms serving two tracks. The station building is located on the side of the Kichijoji-bound platform, and connected to the Shibuya-bound platform by an underground passageway.

In July 2006, the station underwent renovations to provide universal accessibility, including installation of elevators, toilets, and renovations of the station office.

Platforms

History
The station opened on 1 August 1933.

From 22 February 2013, station numbering was introduced on Keio lines, with Inokashira-kōen Station becoming "IN16".

Passenger statistics
In fiscal 2019, the station was used by an average of 6,814 passengers daily. 

The passenger figures for previous years are as shown below.

Surrounding area
The station is close to Inokashira Park, the source of the Kanda River and is a favorite spot for springtime hanami, or cherry-blossom viewing.

It is situated in a quiet residential area with only a handful of shops and restaurants, but Kichijōji is only a 10-minute walk away (600 m).

References

External links

 Keio Inokashira-kōen Station information 

Railway stations in Tokyo
Railway stations in Japan opened in 1933
Keio Inokashira Line
Mitaka, Tokyo